The torta delle rose or torta a rose (from Italian: rose cake) is a typical cake of Mantuan and Brescian cuisine, and is made with leavened dough rich in butter and sugar, which is rolled up and placed in the baking tin, taking the characteristic shape of a basket of rosebuds, hence the name.

History 
When Isabella d'Este became Marchioness consort of Mantua in 1490, by marrying Francesco II Gonzaga, the cuisine of Mantua was influenced by that of Emilia: the Marchioness used the advice of Cristoforo di Messisbugo, cook of the Lords of Ferrara, who seems to have created the "cake of roses" especially for her.

See also
 List of cakes
 List of Italian desserts and pastries

References 

Italian cakes
Cuisine of Lombardy